Bugnicourt is a commune in the Nord department in northern France. It is located south east of Douai and east of Arras.

Economy and culture
There is a small business park, Parc d'activités de la Tuilerie, which hosts a number of creative and manufacturing enterprises.

Each August, the town celebrates the annual "Fete du Boeuf" (Beef Festival).

Population

Heraldry

See also
Communes of the Nord department

References

Communes of Nord (French department)
French Hainaut